The 2009 Tokyo Yakult Swallows season features the Swallows quest to win their first Central League title since 2001.

Regular season

Standings

Game log

|-align="center" bgcolor="#ffbbbb"
| 1 || April 3 || @Tigers || 5 - 2 || Ando (1-0) || Ishikawa (0-1) || Fujikawa (1) || 33,792 || 0-1-0
|-align="center" bgcolor="bbffbb"
| 2 || April 4 || @Tigers || 1 - 5 || Sato (1-0) || Nomi (0-1) ||  || 33,449 || 1-1-0
|-align="center" bgcolor="bbffbb"
| 3 || April 5 || @Tigers || 6 - 7 || Kawashima (1-0) || Fukuhara (0-1) || Lim (1) || 33,436 || 2-1-0
|-align="center" bgcolor="#ffbbbb"
| 4 || April 7 || Dragons || 3 - 4 || Takahashi (1-0) || Oshimoto (0-1) || Iwase (2) || 17,538 || 2-2-0
|-align="center" bgcolor="bbffbb"
| 5 || April 8 || Dragons || 8 - 4 || Kida (1-0) || Nakata (0-1) ||  || 15,089 || 3-2-0
|-align="center" bgcolor="bbffbb"
| 6 || April 9 || Dragons || 10 - 7 || Ishikawa (1-1) || Asao (1-1) || Lim (2) || 14,526 || 4-2-0
|-align="center" bgcolor="#ffbbbb"
| 7 || April 10 || @BayStars || 9 - 1 || Miura (1-1) || Sato (1-1) ||  || 12,791 || 4-3-0
|-align="center" bgcolor="bbffbb"
| 8 || April 11 || @BayStars || 0 - 3 || Ichiba (1-0) || Glynn (0-2) || Lim (3) || 17,817 || 5-3-0
|-align="center" bgcolor="#ffbbbb"
| 9 || April 12 || @BayStars || 5 - 3 || Yamaguchi (1-0) || Kawashima (1-1) || Ishii (1) || 17,972 || 5-4-0
|-align="center" bgcolor="#bbbbbb"
| — || April 14 || Giants || colspan=6|Postponed (rained out)
|-align="center" bgcolor="#ffbbbb"
| 10 || April 15 || Giants || 2 - 6 || Greisinger (2-1) || Kida (1-1) ||  || 20,072 || 5-5-0
|-align="center" bgcolor="bbffbb"
| 11 || April 16 || Giants || 6 - 2 || Tateyama (1-0) || Utsumi (0-1) ||  || 16,592 || 6-5-0
|-align="center" bgcolor="bbffbb"
| 12 || April 17 || Carp || 6 - 1 || Ishikawa (2-1) || Aoki (0-1) ||  || 10,865 || 7-5-0
|-align="center" bgcolor="bbffbb"
| 13 || April 18 || Carp || 1 - 0 || Sato (2-1) || Maeda (2-1) || Lim (4) || 25,455 || 8-5-0
|-align="center" bgcolor="bbffbb"
| 14 || April 19 || Carp || 8 - 2 || Kawashima (2-1) || Shinoda (1-1) ||  || 17,702 || 9-5-0
|-align="center" bgcolor="#ffbbbb"
| 15 || April 21 || @Giants || 4 - 0 || Greisinger (3-1) || Kida (1-2) ||  || 20,817 || 9-6-0
|-align="center" bgcolor="#ffbbbb"
| 16 || April 22 || @Giants || 3 - 2 || Yamaguchi (2-0) || Igarashi (0-1) || Kroon (6) || 15,876 || 9-7-0
|-align="center" bgcolor="#ffbbbb"
| 17 || April 23 || @Giants || 2 - 1 || Ochi (2-0) || Oshimoto (0-2) ||  || 20,120 || 9-8-0
|-align="center" bgcolor="#ffbbbb"
| 18 || April 24 || BayStars || 0 - 3 || Miura (2-2) || Ichiba (1-1) || Ishii (5) || 12,512 || 9-9-0
|-align="center" bgcolor="#bbbbbb"
| — || April 25 || BayStars || colspan=6|Postponed (rained out)
|-align="center" bgcolor="#ffbbbb"
| 19 || April 26 || BayStars || 2 - 6 || Glynn (1-3) || Sato (2-2) ||  || 16,185 || 9-10-0
|-align="center" bgcolor="bbffbb"
| 20 || April 28 || @Dragons || 2 - 4 || Kida (2-2) || Asakura (2-1) || Lim (5) || 12,115 || 10-10-0
|-align="center" bgcolor="bbffbb"
| 21 || April 29 || @Dragons || 1 - 7 || Tateyama (2-0) || Asao (2-3) ||  || 33,318 || 11-10-0
|-align="center" bgcolor="bbffbb"
| 22 || April 30 || @Dragons || 0 - 3 || Ishikawa (3-1) || Yoshimi (2-2) || Lim (6) || 29,184 || 12-10-0
|-

|-align="center" bgcolor="#ffbbbb"
| 23 || May 2 || @Carp || 9 - 2 || Umetsu (2-0) || Ichiba (1-2) ||  || 31,427 || 12-11-0
|-align="center" bgcolor="bbffbb"
| 24 || May 3 || @Carp || 2 - 3 || Kida (3-2) || Yokoyama (0-1) || Lim (7) || 31,622 || 13-11-0
|-align="center" bgcolor="bbffbb"
| 25 || May 4 || @Carp || 3 - 5 || Oshimoto (1-2) || Makino (0-1) || Lim (8) || 31,834 || 14-11-0
|-align="center" bgcolor="#bbbbbb"
| — || May 5 || Tigers ||  colspan=6|Postponed (rained out)
|-align="center" bgcolor="#bbbbbb"
| — || May 6 || Tigers || colspan=6|Postponed (rained out)
|-align="center" bgcolor="bbffbb"
| 26 || May 7 || Tigers || 2 - 1 || Ishikawa (4-1) || Kubo (0-2) || Lim (9) || 15,575 || 15-11-0
|-align="center" bgcolor="#ffbbbb"
| 27 || May 9 || Carp || 1 - 4 || Lewis (2-1) || Kawashima (2-2) || Nagakawa (10) || 19,119 || 15-12-0
|-align="center" bgcolor="bbffbb"
| 28 || May 10 || Carp || 4 - 1 || Tateyama (3-0) || Hayashi (0-1) || Lim (10) || 14,891 || 16-12-0
|-align="center" bgcolor="#ffbbbb"
| 29 || May 12 || @Dragons || 6 - 3 || Asakura (3-2) || Ichiba (1-3) || Iwase (7) || 9,059 || 16-13-0
|-align="center" bgcolor="bbffbb"
| 30 || May 13 || @Dragons || 1 - 7 || Ishikawa (5-1) || Asao (3-4) ||  || 26,258 || 17-13-0
|-align="center" bgcolor="bbffbb"
| 31 || May 14 || @Dragons || 5 - 8 || Matsuoka (1-0) || Ogasawara (0-1) || Lim (11) || 25,010 || 18-13-0
|-align="center" bgcolor="bbffbb"
| 32 || May 15 || Tigers || 2 - 1 || Matsuoka (2-0) || Nomi (2-4) || Lim (12) || 22,528 || 19-13-0
|-align="center" bgcolor="bbffbb"
| 33 || May 16 || Tigers || 4 - 1 || Tateyama (4-0) || Fukuhara (2-3) || Lim (13) || 28,380 || 20-13-0
|-align="center" bgcolor="bbffbb"
| 34 || May 17 || Tigers || 2 - 1 || Kawashima (3-2) || Egusa (2-2) || Igarashi (1) || 19,534 || 21-13-0
|-align="center" bgcolor="bbffbb"
| 35 || May 19 || @Eagles || 3 - 7 || Ishikawa (6-1) || Rasner (2-3) ||  || 12,691 || 22-13-0
|-align="center" bgcolor="#ffbbbb"
| 36 || May 20 || @Eagles || 2 - 0 || Tanaka (6-0) || Sato (2-3) ||  || 19,295 || 22-14-0
|-align="center" bgcolor="bbffbb"
| 37 || May 22 || @Fighters || 2 - 3 || Tateyama (5-0) || Fujii (3-2) || Lim (14) || 20,932 || 23-14-0
|-align="center" bgcolor="#ffbbbb"
| 38 || May 23 || @Fighters || 3 - 0 || Darvish (6-1) || Barrett (0-1) ||  || 31,288 || 23-15-0
|-align="center" bgcolor="#ffbbbb"
| 39 || May 24 || Hawks || 5 - 8 || Otonari (2-3) || Kawashima (3-3) ||  || 16,518 || 23-16-0
|-align="center" bgcolor="#ffbbbb"
| 40 || May 25 || Hawks || 2 - 3 || Sugiuchi (5-1) || Ishikawa (6-2) || Mahara (8) || 15,555 || 23-17-0
|-align="center" bgcolor="bbffbb"
| 41 || May 27 || Buffaloes || 5 - 4 || Matsuoka (3-0) || Katsuki (1-1) || Lim (15) || 12,014 || 24-17-0
|-align="center" bgcolor="bbffbb"
| 42 || May 28 || Buffaloes || 4 - 0 || Tateyama (6-0) || Mitsuhara (1-1) ||  || 7,348 || 25-17-0
|-align="center" bgcolor="#ffbbbb"
| 43 || May 30 || @Marines || 6 - 3 || Naruse (3-2) || Tanaka (0-1) ||  || 15,431 || 25-18-0
|-align="center" bgcolor="bbffbb"
| 44 || May 31 || @Marines || 1 - 7 || Kawashima (4-3) || Omine (2-3) ||  || 27,310 || 26-18-0
|-

|-align="center" bgcolor="#ffbbbb"
| 45 || June 2 || @Lions || 7 - 3 || Wasdin (1-2) || Ishikawa (6-3) ||  || 16,001 || 26-19-0
|-
| 46 || June 3 || @Lions ||  ||  ||  ||  ||  || 
|-
| 47 || June 5 || Eagles ||  ||  ||  ||  ||  || 
|-
| 48 || June 6 || Eagles ||  ||  ||  ||  ||  || 
|-
| 49 || June 7 || Fighters ||  ||  ||  ||  ||  || 
|-
| 50 || June 8 || Fighters ||  ||  ||  ||  ||  || 
|-
| 51 || June 10 || @Hawks ||  ||  ||  ||  ||  || 
|-
| 52 || June 11 || @Hawks ||  ||  ||  ||  ||  || 
|-
| 53 || June 13 || @Buffaloes ||  ||  ||  ||  ||  || 
|-
| 54 || June 14 || @Buffaloes ||  ||  ||  ||  ||  || 
|-
| 55 || June 17 || Marines ||  ||  ||  ||  ||  || 
|-
| 56 || June 18 || Marines ||  ||  ||  ||  ||  || 
|-
| 57 || June 20 || Lions ||  ||  ||  ||  ||  || 
|-
| 58 || June 21 || Lions ||  ||  ||  ||  ||  || 
|-
| 59 || June 26 || @Giants ||  ||  ||  ||  ||  || 
|-
| 60 || June 27 || @Giants ||  ||  ||  ||  ||  || 
|-
| 61 || June 28 || @Giants ||  ||  ||  ||  ||  || 
|-
| 62 || June 30 || @BayStars ||  ||  ||  ||  ||  || 
|-

Player stats

Batting

Pitching

References

Tokyo Yakult Swallows
Tokyo Yakult Swallows seasons